Grosvenor Hotel may refer to:

 The Chester Grosvenor Hotel, Chester, England
 Grosvenor House Hotel, London, England